Ibrahim Fadl was an Egyptian swimmer. He competed in the men's 4 × 200 metre freestyle relay at the 1936 Summer Olympics.

References

External links
 

Year of birth missing
Possibly living people
Egyptian male swimmers
Olympic swimmers of Egypt
Swimmers at the 1936 Summer Olympics
Place of birth missing
20th-century Egyptian people